Kishoreganj is a district in Dhaka Division, Bangladesh. Earlier it was a Mohkuma (মহকুমা) under the Mymensingh district. It was taken 2495.07 sq. km of land from Mymensingh district to form present day Kishoreganj District. Kishorganj consists of eight municipalities, 13 upazilas, 105 union parishads, 39 wards, 145 mahallas, 946 mouzas and 1775 villages.

Administration

 Deputy Commissioner:  Md Sarwar Murshed Chowdhury
 Additional Deputy Commissioner (Overall): Tarfdar Md. Aktar Jamil
 Additional Deputy Commissioner (Tax):  Dulal Chandra Sutradhar
 Additional Deputy Commissioner (Education and Information and Communication Technology): Golam Mohammad Bhuiyan
 Additional District Magistrate:  Alamgeer Hosain

Subdistricts/Upazilas

Demographics

According to the 2011 Bangladesh census, Kishoreganj District had a population of 2,911,907, of which 1,432,242 were males and 1,479,665 were females. Rural population was 2,422,877 (83.21%) while urban population was 489,030 (16.79%). Kishoreganj had a literacy rate 40.87% for the population 7 years and above: 41.51% for males and 40.25% for females.

Religion

Kishoreganj contains 3,980 mosques, 530 temples and seven churches. The overwhelming majority of its residents are Muslim.

Education

 Universities
 Bangabandhu Sheikh Mujibur Rahman University
 Ishakha International University Bangladesh
 Medical College
 Shahid Syed Nazrul Islam Medical College
 Jahurul Islam Medical College
 President Abdul Hamid Medical College and Hospital
 College
 Gurudayal Govt. College
 Kishoreganj Govt. Mohila College
 Kuliarchar Govt. College 
 Pakundia Govt. College 
 Govt. Zillur Rahman  Mahila College
 Tarail Muktijoddha Govt. College
 Karimganj Govt. College
 Rastrapati Abdul Hamid Govt. College
 Bajitpur Govt. College
 Hossainpur  Govt College 
 Pakundia Adarsha Mohila College
 Muktijoddha Abdul Haque Govt. College
 Poura Mohila College
 Walinewaz Khan College
 Secondary School
 Kishorganj Govt. Boys' High School
 S.V. Govt. Girls High School
 Polytechnic Institute
 Kishoreganj Polytechnic Institute

Newspapers

Dailies
 Daily Ajker Desh
 Daily Amar Bangladesh 
 Grihakon
 Bhatir Darpan
 Pratahik Chitra

Online dailies
 Muktijoddhar Kantho
 Hauor Kanto
 manabchatona24.com
kalernatunsangbad.com

Weeklies
 Aryagaurava (1904)
 Kishoreganj Bartabaha (1924)
 Akhter (Urdu, 1926)
 Kishoreganj Barta (1946)
 Prativa (1952)
 Natun Patra (1962)

Fortnightlies
 Narasunda (1981)
 Grambangla (1985)
 Sristi (1986)
 Sakal (1988)
 Suchana (1990)
 Kishoreganj Parikrama (1991)
 Manihar (1991)
 Kishoreganj Prabaha (1993)
 Bibarani (Kuliarchar 1993)

Places of interest
Kishoreganj District is a place of Islam and Hinduism. The Meghna and Brahmaputra rivers have contributed to its development. Many traditional events are observed every year, including Kurikhai Mela, a celebrated shrine-oriented festival held every year on the last Monday of the month of Magh at the shrine in Katiadi thana. The notable Shamsuddin Aulia, one of the figures of Hajrat Shahjalal, died there.

Jangalbari Fort
Jangalbari Fort is in the Jangalbari village of Karimganj Upazila. It was once a strong outpost of the Bengal Ruler Isa Khan, who erected several structures inside the fort area. It was severely damaged by the great earthquake in 1897. Isa Khan's descendants still live in the village, and currently Isa Khan's 14th descendant, Dewan Amin Dau Khan, lives in the fort.

Egarosindur
Egarosindur is a village in Kishoreganj. The village is situated on the east side of the river Brahmaputra. The name of this village is found in the Akbornama by the historian Abul Fazal. There is a debate among historians about the history of Egarosindur. Some engraved silver coins, iron-axes, lances and bows and arrows were discovered there presumed to be from the 10th century BC. Historians also believe that Egarosindur was inhabited since 1000 BC, i.e. the time of the Murza. There lived many tribals named Koch and Hajong. Egarosindur was a centre of trade and commerce.

In 380 AD Egarosindur was under the reign of Dobak state. After that this region was reigned by the King of Kamarupa. Another historical analyses prove that in the 8th century Egarosindur was an important river port where Muslim traders exported and imported their product with Rome and Paris. In the 10th century Egarosindur was under the control of Azhaba, a king of Hazradi. Azbaha triumph over this land by defeated King Botong. But after some years Azbaha was beaten by Bebuid Raza and Bebuid Raza was the first popular king of this land. In his time, Egarosindur was reborn again. He built spectacular palaces, forts, big canals, temples etc.

In the second part of the 10th century King Srishochandra controlled this land. After that this area might be governed by Shen king and then it is included with the land of Kamarupa. In the beginning of 14th century the king of Goura, Firoz Shah succeed to win Egarosindur. In 1338 Sultan Fakruddin Mubarak Shah take the authorization of this ancient land. It was seemed that when Sultan was in a critical position, he took shelter in Egarosindur. In 1577 Isa Khan declared Egarosindur a sovereign state. In his age this place appeared as a remarkable place of trade and commerce. In the fort of Egarosindur there held a massive battle between Isa Khan and Mansingh, the general of Akbar. But in the battlefield Mansingh was greatly impressed by the boldness and hospitality of Isa Khan. In one stage when they carried out a duel, Mansingh's sword broke down. Isa Khan did not take his life and most surprisingly he offered his own sword to Mansingh. He said, "I could not kill any helpless person". And then they made an agreement in the battlefield. Akbar granted Isa Khan a  lease over 22 parganas. After Isa Khan, Egarosindur as a distinct entity was again lost to history. In the reign of Shahjahan in 1638, the king of Assam attacked Egarosindur. Though he was not competent to defeat the warrior of Shahjahan, he destroyed this land ruthlessly when he fled from the battlefield.

Shah Mahmud Mosque
It is an attractive building at Egarosindur may be dated sometime around 1680AD. The mosque stands at the back of a slightly raised platform, which is enclosed by a low wall with a gateway consists of an oblong structure with do-chala roof.
The mosque proper is a square structure, 5.79m a side in the inside, and is emphasized with octagonal towers on the four exteriors angles. All these towers shooting high above the roof and terminating in solid kiosks with cupolas, were originally crowned with kalasa finials, still intact in the southern one. The western wall accommodates inside three mihrab –the central one semi –octagonal and the side ones rectangular. The central doorway and central mihrab are larger than their flanking counterparts. The mosque has four axially projected frontones, each corresponding to the centrally located doorways and the central mihrab. The parapets and cornices are horizontal in the usual Mughal fashion.

All the mihrabs are enriched with terracotta decoration. The mihrabs are arched having cuspings in their outer faces. The pilasters, supporting the mihrab arches, show a series of decorated bands topped by a frieze of petals. The spandrels of these arches, though now plain must have been originally enriched with terracotta plaques. Above the rectangular frame of the central mihrab there is a row of arched-niches filled with varieties of small trees containing flowers.
The mosque should specially be noted for its four axially projected frontons with bordering ornamental turrets, a device which must have been borrowed from the four axial iwan-type gateways of the Persian influenced north Indian Mughal standard mosques of Fathpur, Agra and Delhi.

Sadi Mosque
Another structure of Egarosindur, is one of the best-conserved monuments in the country. A pertain inscription tablet, fixed over the central mihrab, record that the mosque was built in 1062 AH (1652 AD) by one Sadi, son of Shaikh Shiroo, during the reign of Shahjahan.

Measuring 25 ft a side, the single-domed square mosque was built on a raised piece of land. There are three arched entrances in the east, and one each in the middle of the north and the south sides. The central archway, which is larger, is set within a slightly projected rectangular frame, but the flanking archways are contained within slightly recessed rectangle. The qibla wall is recessed with three semi-octagonal mihrabs, which correspond to the three eastern doorways. The mosque represents a happy blending of Mughal elements with the Sultanate architectural traits characteristic of Bengal.

Fort of Isha Khan
The remains of the fort are still visible near the site of the Sadi mosque. In this fort Isha Khan fought against Man Singh, the general of Akbar. Recently some valuable antiques have been found in this place, which attest to the important history of this place.

Mazar (graveyard) Sharif
In Egarosindur, many pious and kind religious leaders came here for inviting people into the light of Islam. Some of them named- Borapirer Mazar (Shah Moize uddin Shah Mannunun of Sholakia Shaheb barii,  Samsuddin Bokhari, Fakir Garibullah Shah,  Syed Ahmed Rumi, Nigrin shah and so on. Their mazars are situated in this village. The Mazar of Garibullah shah is in a hill like higher position. People treat their Mazar with great respect. But it is a matter of great pleasure that there are no superstitions and fanatic activities because the villagers are very much conscious about this matter.

Samsuddin Bokhari
The Mazar of Samsuddin Bokhari is situated at Kurikhai, Katiadi, Kishoreganj. It is a historical place of kishoreganj district. Samsuddin Bokhari was a tour companion of Shahjalal. They came together. Samsuddin Bokhari Mazar's also known as Kurikhai Mazar.
The fair is held here every year to mark the death anniversary of Shamsuddin Bokhari. The fair is according to the Bengali calendar. The fair started from the second last Monday of the Magh month of Bangla year, and it continues till the following Monday (last Monday of the month).

Botanical Garden located by the bank of the river Meghna.

Fairy tales 
As it is an ancient place, there are many fairy tales which have become popular in this village. There are tales about the big pond of Bebuid Raza and his wife, two canon of Isa Khan and so on.

Poet Chandravati Shiv Mandir

The Chandravati Shiv Mondir (Temple) built at Katcharipara about 8 kilometres off Kishoreganj town by Deeja Bongshi Das during the later part of 16th century is still adorned with its artistic structural workmanship which attracts the tourists of different areas.

Rivers
 Old Brahmaputra
 Meghna
 Kalni
 Dhanu
 Ghorautra
 Baurii
 Narasunda
 Piyain
 Singuya

Main depressions
 Humaipur (Bajitpur)
 Somai (Nikli)
 Barir (Mithamain)
 Surma Baula (Nikli)
 Tallar Haors (Nikli-Bajitpur-Austagram).

Notable people 
Farid Uddin Masood, Islamic scholar 
Zainul Abedin (1914–1976) – Bangladeshi painter
ABM Zahidul Haq (died 2008) – former Bangladesh Deputy Minister of Shipping and Member of Perliament (MP), founder of Pakundia Adarsha Mohila College
Debabrata Biswas (1911–1980) – Rabindra Sangeet artist
Anandamohan Bose (1847–1906) – Indian politician, academician, social reformer, and lawyer
Chuni Goswami (1938 – 2020) – Indian international footballer and fast class cricketer
Trailokyanath Chakravarty (1889–1970) – Indian revolutionary
Nirad C. Chaudhuri (1897–1999) – Indian Bengali−English writer and man of letters
AFM Alim Chowdhury (1928–1971) an eye doctor and intellectual
Upendrakishore Ray Chowdhury (1863–1915) – author, painter
Abul Fateh (1924–2010) – Diplomat and politician
Prabodh Chandra Goswami (1911–1987) – educationist
Abdul Hamid (politician) (born 1944) – the current president of Bangladesh
Shah Abdul Hannan (1939–2021) – Islamic philosopher, educationist, writer, economist and social worker, chairman of the National Board of Revenue, chairman of the Anti-Corruption Commission and deputy governor of Bangladesh Bank
Amir Hossain (born 1957) – judge of the Supreme Court of Bangladesh 
Jahurul Islam (1928–1995) – industrial entrepreneur
Syed Ashraful Islam (1952–2019) – Minister of Public Administration of Bangladesh Government
Syed Nazrul Islam (1925–1975) – first vice president of Bangladesh
Ilias Kanchan (born 1956) – distinguished hero of Dhaka movie
Ivy Rahman (1944–2004) – Member of Parliament and former politician
Zillur Rahman (1929–2013) – former president of Bangladesh and a prominent politician
Nazmul Hasan Papon(born 1961) - the current president of Bangladesh Cricket Board and a member of parliament from Kishoreganj-6 constituency.
Symon Sadik (born 1985) – notable hero of Bangla film industry
Idris Ali (born 1947-2002)- A great political leader known as "NEETA" to all, was from Dampara, Nikli, Kishoreganj.
Biplob Kumar Sarker

See also 
 Egarosindur
 Pakundia Adarsha Mohila College

Notes

References

External links

 
Districts of Bangladesh